Antonio Palafox (born 28 April 1936) is a Mexican male former tennis player. He and compatriot Rafael Osuna won the doubles at the U.S. Open in 1962 and at Wimbledon in 1963.  He is remembered along with Rafael Osuna, Francisco "Pancho" Contreras and Mario Llamas for guiding Mexico to the final of the Davis Cup in 1962.

He is a former coach of John McEnroe, and taught him to put yourself in an advantageous positions and putting your opponent in difficult positions.

Grand Slam finals

Doubles (2 titles, 2 runners-up)

Mixed Doubles (1 runner-up)

References

External links
 
 
 

1936 births
Mexican male tennis players
Tennis players at the 1959 Pan American Games
Pan American Games gold medalists for Mexico
United States National champions (tennis)
Wimbledon champions (pre-Open Era)
Grand Slam (tennis) champions in men's doubles
Sportspeople from Guadalajara, Jalisco
Pan American Games medalists in tennis
Living people
Central American and Caribbean Games medalists in tennis
Central American and Caribbean Games bronze medalists for Mexico
Medalists at the 1959 Pan American Games
20th-century Mexican people